Pacific National is one of Australia's largest rail freight businesses.

History

In February 2002, National Rail's freight operations and rollingstock (owned by the Federal, New South Wales and Victorian Governments) were combined with FreightCorp (owned by the New South Wales Government) and sold to a joint venture between Patrick Corporation and Toll Holdings as Pacific National.

In February 2004, Pacific National purchased Australian Transport Network, operator of ATN Access and AN Tasrail. In August 2004, Pacific National purchased Freight Australia, giving Pacific National control of the Victorian non-urban rail track, excluding the interstate network which is controlled by the Australian Rail Track Corporation.

As part of the sale conditions, the Australian Competition and Consumer Commission attached special conditions to the sale to ensure competition in the rail freight industry. The company was required to provide a 'starter pack' of locomotives, wagons, train paths, and freight terminals for a third party rail operator on the east-west route across the Nullarbor Plain. To fulfill this, Pacific National sold nine refurbished G class locomotives to competitor SCT Logistics to allow it to operate its own services.

In March 2005, Pacific National Queensland became the first non-Queensland Rail narrow gauge commercial rail operation in Queensland, with the commencement of container services between Brisbane and Cairns.

In November 2006, Pacific National entered into an agreement to sell the remainder of its Victorian rail lease of the network back to the Victorian Government. The sale was completed in May 2007, with the government owned V/Line taking over management of the track.

In 2005, Toll Holdings launched a hostile takeover bid for its joint venture partner Patrick Corporation which was successful giving Toll Holdings 100% ownership of Pacific National. In 2007, Toll Holdings was restructured into two separately ASX listed companies: Toll Holdings and Asciano Limited. As part of this restructure, Pacific National became a wholly owned subsidiary of Asciano Limited.

In 2009, Pacific National Queensland further expanded their narrow gauge operations, entering the export coal market dominated by incumbent Queensland Rail.

In 2016, Asciano agreed to sell Pacific National to Australian Logistics Acquisition Investments Pty Limited, a consortium of Global Infrastructure Partners, CPP Investment Board, China Investment Corporation, GIC Private Limited and British Columbia Investment Management Corporation. The transfer was completed on 19 August 2016.

Controversy

Tasmania 2005
In September 2005, Pacific National angered the Tasmanian State and Australian Federal Governments when it threatened to withdraw all services unless the governments paid a $100 million subsidy. Initially the governments refused to act on the issue claiming they would not be "held to mercy" by Pacific National, owned by Toll and Patrick Corporation, "which are extremely profitable multi-national companies". However, state infrastructure minister Bryan Green and federal counterpart transport minister Warren Truss announced a $120 million rescue package.

In May 2007, the Tasmanian Government, the Federal Government and Pacific National came to an agreement regarding the funding, ownership and operation of the Tasmanian railway network; with the Tasmanian Government acquiring the railway infrastructure previously leased to Pacific National, who would continue to provide above rail services on the network. In September 2009, the Tasmanian Government purchased the Tasmanian rail business, with rail infrastructure and railway operations to be maintained, managed and owned by a new TasRail.

Rural services 2007
In December 2007, Pacific National announced plans to sell or close its grain transport and Portlink rural container business operations in Victoria, selling or closing Patrick's intermodal freight business in Tasmania, and downsizing to a bare minimum Pacific National's grain operations across New South Wales. The decision was criticised as it forced grain growers to use higher cost road transport to transport the annual grain harvest from rural silos to the ports. The decision has seen many commentators accuse Pacific National of acquiring the operations of Freight Australia in 2004 only for the purposes of asset stripping and eliminating competition in rail freight.

In 2008, the company declined to sell wagons which had reached the end of their useful life to other Australian rail operators, indicating that the wagons would be scrapped or exported to Saudi Arabia.

The container freight service to Horsham, Victoria was almost cancelled in April 2008 but was given a three-month reprieve by the company. In July 2008, the service was taken over by QR National and later Qube.

Operations
Pacific National operates in all mainland states and territories. As of June 2012, the company operates 596 locomotives and 12,875 wagons. Services include bulk freight (coal, grain, steel, ore), intermodal containers (domestic and import-export), and specialised services such as 'hook and pull' for long-distance passenger trains.

The Pacific National steel contract was renewed with BlueScope and OneSteel in 2006 for $1bn, making it the largest ever freight rail contract in Australia. The deal involves haulage of about 3 million tonnes of steel over seven years. Pacific National has intermodal freight facilities at the Brisbane Freight Terminal in Queensland, the Melbourne Freight Terminal in Victoria, the Sydney Freight Terminal in New South Wales, the Adelaide Freight Terminal in South Australia and the Kewdale Freight Terminal in Western Australia.

Current locomotive fleet

In addition, Pacific National leases locomotives from CFCL Australia and operates three WH class locomotives on behalf of Whitehaven Coal.

Former fleet

All Pacific National Tasmania locomotives were sold to TasRail in 2009.

References

Bibliography

External links

Pacific National website
Asciano website
Railpage Organisations
Railpage - Pacific National Locomotives

 
Interstate rail in Australia
Freight railway companies of Australia
Rail transport in Tasmania
2002 establishments in Australia
Railway companies established in 2002